Cilliers is a surname. Notable people with the surname include:

Charl Cilliers (disambiguation), multiple people
Sarel Cilliers (1801–1871)
Pat Cilliers (born 1987), South African rugby union footballer
Paul Cilliers (1956–2011), South African philosopher
Barend Cilliers (1955-2016), South African medical practitioner and farmer

Afrikaans-language surnames